Boreoelona is a genus of gastropods in the family Bithyniidae.

Species
Boreoelona caerulans (Westerlund, 1896)
Boreoelona contortrix (Lindholm, 1909)
Boreoelona lindholmiana (Starobogatov & Streletzkaja, 1967)

References

Bithyniidae
Gastropod genera